This is a timeline documenting the events of heavy metal music in the year 1999.

Newly formed bands
 3 Inches of Blood
 10 Years
 A Life Once Lost
 A Perfect Circle
 Abaddon
 Aeon 
 Amenra
 Anaal Nathrakh
 Andromeda 
 Arallu
 Arthemis
 The Autumn Offering
 Avantasia
 Avenged Sevenfold
 Becoming the Archetype
 Battlelore
 Blaze
 Beautiful Creatures
 Before the Dawn 
 Beyond the Bridge
 Biomechanical
 Bleeding Through
 Blindead
 Blood Stain Child
 Bloodlined Calligraphy
 Breaking Benjamin
 Burning Point
 Burnt by the Sun
 Darkspace 
 DragonForce (then DragonHeart)
 Dragonland
 Divinity Destroyed
 Dominia 
 Dream Evil
 Dreamtale
 Earshot
 Enter Shikari
 Evile
 Falconer
 Five Pointe O
 For My Pain...
 Forgotten Tomb
 Grand Magus
 Halford 
 Hour of Penance 
 Kalmah
 Killswitch Engage
 The Kovenant
 Lamb of God (formed from Burn the Priest)
 Lifer (then Strangers with Candy)
 Lumsk
 Mastodon
 Metalium
 Methods of Mayhem
 Metsatöll
 Mors Principium Est
 MullMuzzler
 Old Man Gloom
 Protest the Hero
 Psycroptic
 QueenAdreena (then Queen Adreena)
 Raintime
 The Red Chord
 Sargeist
 Sabaton
 Seether (as Saron Gas)
 Shade Empire
 Shadowkeep
 Sikth
 Silent Force
 Sleepytime Gorilla Museum
 Sunstorm
 Tomahawk
 Toxic Holocaust
 Trivium
 Ufomammut
 Voyager

Reformed bands
 Armored Saint
 Destruction (Schmier's comeback)
 Lost Horizon (reformed as Highlander, name was changed soon after)
 Pungent Stench
 Rollins Band
 Skid Row
 White Lion

Albums

 Aborted - The Purity of Perversion
 Agalloch - Pale Folklore
 Akercocke - Rape of the Bastard Nazarene
 Alabama Thunderpussy - River City Revival
 Alice Cooper - The Life and Crimes of Alice Cooper (box set)
 Alice in Chains - Nothing Safe: Best of the Box (compilation)	
 Alice in Chains - Music Bank (box set)
 American Head Charge - Trepanation
 Amon Amarth - The Avenger
 Amorphis - Tuonela (album)
 Anathema - Judgement
 Angelcorpse - The Inexorable
 Anvil – Speed of Sound
 Arch Enemy - Burning Bridges
 Atari Teenage Riot - 60 Second Wipe Out
 Backyard Babies - Total 13
 Bal-Sagoth - The Power Cosmic
 Bang Tango - Greatest Tricks
 Bang Tango - Untied & Live
 Behemoth - Satanica
 Biohazard - New World Disorder
 Black Label Society - Sonic Brew
 Botch – We Are the Romans
 Broken Teeth - Broken Teeth
 Bruce Dickinson - Scream for Me Brazil (live)
 Buckcherry - Buckcherry (album)
 Burn the Priest - Burn the Priest
 Cannibal Corpse - Bloodthirst (album)
 Chevelle - Point #1
 Children of Bodom - Hatebreeder
 Chris Cornell - Euphoria Morning
 Cinderella - Live at the Key Club
 Coal Chamber - Chamber Music
 Control Denied - The Fragile Art of Existence
 Cradle of Filth - From the Cradle to Enslave (EP)
 Crazy Town - The Gift of Game
 The Crown - Hell is Here
 Dangerous Toys - Vitamins and Crash Helmets Tour – Greatest Hits Live
 Danzig – Danzig 6:66: Satan's Child
 Darkthrone - Ravishing Grimness
 Dark Tranquility - Projector
 Def Leppard - Euphoria
 Destruction - The Butcher Strikes Back (demo)
 DGeneration - Through The Darkness
 The Dillinger Escape Plan - Calculating Infinity
 Dimmu Borgir - Spiritual Black Dimensions
 Dope - Felons and Revolutionaries
 Drain STH - Freaks of Nature
 Dream Theater - Metropolis Pt. 2: Scenes from a Memory
 Edguy - Theater of Salvation
 Emperor - IX Equilibrium
 Evergrey - Solitude, Dominance, Tragedy
 Eternal Tears of Sorrow - Vilda Mánnu
 Filter - Title of Record
 Finntroll - Midnattens Widunder
 Gamma Ray - Power Plant
 Godflesh - Us and Them
 God Forbid - Reject the Sickness
 Gilby Clarke - 99 Live
 Graveworm - As the Angels Reach the Beauty
 Grip Inc. - Solidify
 Gwar – We Kill Everything 
 H.I.M. - Razorblade Romance    
 Hate Eternal - Conquering the Throne
 Hypocrisy - Hypocrisy              
 Immolation - Failures for Gods
 Immortal - At the Heart of Winter
 In Flames - Colony
 Integrity – Integrity 2000
 Jetboy - Lost & Found
 Kamelot - The Fourth Legacy
 Katatonia - Tonight's Decision
 Konkhra - Come Down Cold
 Korn - Issues
 Kreator - Endorama
 Lacrimosa - Elodia
 Lacuna Coil - In a Reverie
 L.A. Guns - Greatest Hits and Black Beauties
 L.A. Guns - Shrinking Violet
 Lefay - Symphony of the Damned, Re-symphonised (re-recording)
 Lefay - The Seventh Seal
 Limp Bizkit - Significant Other
 Lock Up - Pleasures Pave Sewers
 Love/Hate - Let's Eat
 Tony MacAlpine - Master of Paradise
 Machine Head - The Burning Red
 Yngwie Malmsteen - Alchemy
 Marduk - Panzer Division Marduk
 Marilyn Manson - The Last Tour on Earth (live)
 Mass Hysteria - Contraddiction
 Mercyful Fate - 9
 Megadeth - Risk
 Metal Church - Masterpeace
 Metallica - S&M (live)
 Metalium - Millennium Metal – Chapter One 
 Ministry - Dark Side of the Spoon
 Mr. Bungle - California
 Moonspell - The Butterfly Effect
 Morgion - Solinari
 Mortician - Chainsaw Dismemberment
 Mortification - Hammer of God
 Mötley Crüe - Supersonic and Demonic Relics
 Motörhead - Everything Louder Than Everyone Else (live)
 Mushroomhead - M3
 My Dying Bride - The Light at the End of the World
 Napalm Death - Words from the Exit Wound
 Necrophobic - The Third Antichrist
 Neurosis - Times of Grace
 New American Shame - New American Shame
 Nevermore - Dreaming Neon Black
 Nine Inch Nails - The Fragile
 Novembers Doom - Of Sculptured Ivy and Stone Flowers
 Occult – Of Flesh and Blood
 Oomph! - Plastik
 Opeth - Still Life
 Orchid - Chaos Is Me
 Overkill - Necroshine
 Pain - Rebirth
 Pessimist - Blood for the Gods   
 Pentagram - Review Your Choices               
 Pig Destroyer - Pig Destroyer / Gnob (split EP)
 Pitchshifter - Un-United Kingdom (EP)
 P.O.D. - The Fundamental Elements of Southtown
  Poison the Well - The Opposite of December
 Powerman 5000 - Tonight the Stars Revolt!
 Pretty Boy Floyd - Porn Stars (album)
 Primal Fear - Jaws Of Death
 Primus - Antipop
 Pro-Pain – Act of God
 Queensryche - Q2K
 Quiet Riot - Alive and Well
 Rage - Ghosts
 Rage Against the Machine - The Battle of Los Angeles
 Rammstein - Live Aus Berlin (live)
 Ratt - Ratt
 Reveille - Laced
 Rotting Christ - Sleep of the Angels
 Samael - Eternal
 Satyricon - Rebel Extravaganza
 Scorpions - Eye II Eye
 Sebastian Bach - Bring 'Em Bach Alive!
 Septicflesh - Revolution DNA
 Sevendust - Home
 Sinergy - Beware the Heavens
 Six Feet Under - Maximum Violence
 Skinlab - Disembody: The New Flesh
 Slaughter - Back to Reality
 Slipknot -  Slipknot
 Sodom - Code Red
 Solefald - Neonism
 Sonata Arctica - Ecliptica
 Staind - Dysfunction
 Static-X - Wisconsin Death Trip
 Steve Vai - The Ultra Zone
 Stone Temple Pilots - No. 4
 Stratovarius - The Chosen Ones (compilation)
 Suicidal Tendencies – Freedumb
 Summoning - Stronghold
 Testament - The Gathering
 The Black Halos - The Black Halos
 Therapy? - Suicide Pact – You First
 Therion - Crowning of Atlantis
 Throwdown - Beyond Repair
 Tristania - Beyond the Veil
 Type O Negative - World Coming Down
 Underoath – Act of Depression
 uneXpect - Utopia
 Vintersorg - Ödemarkens son
 Virgin Steele - The House of Atreus Act I
 Vision of Disorder – For the Bleeders
 Warrant - Greatest & Latest
 W.A.S.P. - Helldorado
 White Skull - Tales From The North
 Will Haven - WHVN
 Zao - Liberate Te Ex Inferis

Disbandments
 Death
 Far (reformed in 2008)
 Mercyful Fate- on hiatus

Events
 Drummer Tommy Lee leaves Mötley Crüe.
 Ex-drummer of Megadeth Gar Samuelson dies at age 41 from liver failure.
 Singer Blaze Bayley leaves Iron Maiden, while Bruce Dickinson and guitarist Adrian Smith re-join.
 Kittie bassist Tanya Candler quits. She is later replaced by Talena Atfield.
 ICS Vortex joins Dimmu Borgir on bass/backing vocals. Drummer Nicholas Barker leaves Cradle of Filth and joins as well.
 Singer Naoki Hashimoto left Outrage.
 Mudvayne signs with Epic Records.
 Poison appear in an episode of Behind the Music.

1990s in heavy metal music
Metal